HD 256 is a binary star system in the equatorial constellation of Cetus. It has a white hue and is dimly visible to the naked eye with an apparent visual magnitude of 6.20. Based upon parallax measurements, the system is located at a distance of approximately 474 light years from the Sun. It is drifting closer with a radial velocity of −10 km/s.

Originally considered a single star, it was reported to be a shell star in 1982. Circumstellar absorption lines were then found to be variable, showing a similarity to the edge-on debris disk surrounding Beta Pictoris. The stellar classification of A2 IV/V matched an A-type star near the end of its main sequence lifetime, showing traits of an emerging subgiant star phase.

A 2019 study using PIONIER (VLTI) and 32 years of radial velocity measurements concluded that HD 256 is instead a binary star. The variable component of the spectral lines do not come from exocomets according to this study, but rather from the binarity. Each individual star holds its own circumstellar shell. The adjusted classification is of a rapidly rotating main sequence shell star of type A3Vn sh.

References

A-type main-sequence stars
Shell stars
Binary stars
Cetus (constellation)
Durchmusterung objects
000256
000602
0010
J00071825-1723132